Matt Cain (born 27 December 1974) is a British writer and broadcaster.  He is best known for the novels The Madonna of Bolton, The Secret Life of Albert Entwistle and Becoming Ted.

Career 
Cain was born in Bury, Greater Manchester, England, and brought up in nearby Bolton. He was educated at state schools and then Queens' College Cambridge University.

Cain spent ten years making arts and entertainment programmes for ITV, including documentaries about Freddie Mercury, Mamma Mia! and The Da Vinci Code, and profiles of Ian McKellen, Darcey Bussell and Will Young for The South Bank Show.

Between 2010 and 2013, Cain worked in front of the camera as Channel 4 News first-ever culture editor, a role in which he attracted acclaim for his coverage of the Women's Prize for Fiction, the Mercury Music Prize and the Turner Prize, as well as interviews with Grayson Perry, the Spice Girls and Pedro Almodóvar.

Cain's first novel, Shot Through the Heart, was published by Pan Macmillan in 2014. The second, Nothing But Trouble, was published in 2015.

Between 2016 and 2018 Cain worked as editor-in-chief of Attitude, a UK magazine for gay men. Whilst in the role he negotiated world-exclusive covers with Sam Smith, Ricky Martin and James Corden, launched and hosted the #AttitudeHeroes podcast, and ran the Attitude Awards, hosted by Tom Daley, with winners including Prince Harry and Kylie Minogue. He also wrote exclusive reports on his personal experience of HIV/AIDS prevention drug PrEP, homophobia in Russia, and life for gay people in China.

As a freelance journalist, Cain has written articles for all the UK's major newspapers and appeared on Sky News, BBC Breakfast and Good Morning Britain.  He was a judge for the 2013 Costa Book Awards, and the Polari First Novel Prize 2014 and continues to judge the South Bank Sky Arts Awards. He has been nominated for Stonewall's Writer of the Year award and in September 2017 was voted winner of Diversity in Media's Journalist of the Year award.

In October 2017 Cain crowdfunded his third novel The Madonna of Bolton via Unbound, after receiving over 30 rejections from publishers, reportedly due to its gay protagonist and theme. The title reached its funding target in seven days, becoming Unbound's fastest-crowdfunded novel. Pledges came in from 28 countries and the project was backed by celebrities including David Walliams, Mark Gatiss, Gok Wan, S. J. Watson, Lisa Jewell and Arlene Phillips. The Madonna of Bolton was published by Unbound in July 2018.

Cain is an ambassador for both Manchester Pride and the Albert Kennedy Trust, a national youth LGBT+ homelessness charity. He's also a patron of LGBT History Month. In 2021 he was awarded an honorary doctorate from the University of Bolton.

His novel The Secret Life of Albert Entwistle was published by Headline Review in May 2021.  In 2021 he presented the flagship discussion show Sunday Roast on Virgin Radio Pride and returned to the station in 2022 to present Matt Cain Meets.   

His next novel, Becoming Ted, was published by Headline Review in January 2023.  His first musical, Drag Addict, co-written with David Andrew Wilson, with concept development and choreography by Arlene Phillips, will open at HOME Manchester in July 2023 .Cain now lives in London with his husband, Harry, and their cat, Nelly.

Publications 
 Shot Through the Heart
 Nothing But Trouble
 The Madonna of Bolton
 The Secret Life of Albert Entwistle
 Becoming Ted

References 

1974 births
Alumni of Queens' College, Cambridge
British podcasters
Channel 4 people
English journalists
British LGBT journalists
English LGBT writers
Living people
People from Bury, Greater Manchester